Francisco Vidal Franco Cisneros (born 25 August 1987 in Autlán, Jalisco, México) is a Mexican footballer, who plays as defender for Deportivo Toluca.

Club career
Franco was one of the many uprooted young players from Toluca's secondary squad Atlético Mexiquense by then coach Américo Gallego. He made his professional debut with Toluca during the Clausura 2007 season.

External links

1987 births
Living people
People from Autlán, Jalisco
Footballers from Jalisco
Association football defenders
Association football midfielders
Deportivo Toluca F.C. players
La Piedad footballers
Querétaro F.C. footballers
Atlético Mexiquense footballers
Liga MX players
Mexican footballers